Sultan Amir Ahmad Bathhouse, also known as the Qasemi Bathhouse, is a traditional Iranian public bathhouse (hammam) in Kashan, Iran. It was constructed in the 16th century, during the Safavid era; however, the bathhouse was damaged in 1778 as a result of an earthquake and was renovated during the Qajar era. The bathhouse is named after Imamzadeh Sultan Amir Ahmad, whose mausoleum is nearby.

Sultan Amir Ahmad Bathhouse, with an area of around 1000 square meters, consists of two main parts: the sarbineh (dressing hall) and garmkhaneh (hot bathing hall). The sarbineh is a large octagonal hall and has an octagonal pool in the middle, separated by 8 pillars from the outer section. There are four pillars in the garmkhaneh, which make smaller bathing rooms all around as well as the entrance section to the khazineh (final bathing room) in the middle. The interior of the bathhouse is decorated with turquoise and gold tilework, plasterwork, brickwork, as well as artistic paintings. The roof of the bathhouse is made of multiple domes that contain convex glasses to provide sufficient lighting to the bathhouse while concealing it from the outside.

Gallery

References

External links

Description in Persian
More description

Public baths in Iran

Buildings and structures completed in the 16th century
Architecture in Iran
Buildings and structures in Kashan
Tourist attractions in Kashan